The 1876 Frome by-election was fought on 23 November 1876.  The byelection was fought due to the resignation  of the incumbent Conservative MP, Henry Lopes in order to become a Judge of the High Court of Justice.  It was won by the Liberal candidate Henry Samuelson.

See also 
 1853 Frome by-election
 1854 Frome by-election
 1856 Frome by-election

References

1876 in England
Frome
1876 elections in the United Kingdom
By-elections to the Parliament of the United Kingdom in Somerset constituencies
19th century in Somerset